The Ziggy Stardust Tour was a concert tour by David Bowie during 1972–73, to promote the studio albums Hunky Dory, The Rise and Fall of Ziggy Stardust and the Spiders from Mars and Aladdin Sane. Bowie was accompanied by his backing group, the Spiders from Mars, and integrated choreography, costumes and make-up into the live shows to make them a wider entertainment package. The tour generated significant press coverage, drawing positive reviews and launching Bowie to stardom.

The tour covered the UK, the US and Japan. It moved from small pub and club gigs at the beginning, to highly publicised sold-out shows at the end. At the tour's last gig at the Hammersmith Odeon on 3 July 1973, Bowie shocked fans by announcing that it was the last show he would do with the Spiders from Mars.

Itinerary
The tour lasted a year and a half and included three legs in the UK, two in the US and one in Japan.

1972
The first show was on 29 January 1972 at the Borough Assembly Hall, Aylesbury, and featured Bowie with his backing group the Spiders from Mars: guitarist Mick Ronson, bassist Trevor Bolder and drummer Mick Woodmansey. Audio engineer Robin Mayhew had started working on the PA and sound equipment since the end of the previous year, and was the principal sound engineer for the entire tour.

Unlike typical rock concerts at the time, the shows featured a theatrical element with a rough storyline, and several make-up and costume changes. Bowie wanted the shows to be entertainment and to be outrageous, which the Beatles and the Rolling Stones had been at one time, and collaborated with mime artist Lindsay Kemp with the on-stage choreography. Looking for a change of image, Bowie asked local hairdresser Suzi Fussey to cut his long blond hair, later dyeing it red. Some group members were unsure about the stage clothes Bowie asked them to wear, but quickly changed their minds after they realised the attention it gave them with female fans.

The second show was at the Toby Jug pub in Tolworth on 10 February, where Bowie unveiled his "Ziggy Stardust" persona for the first time in front of an audience of around 60. Early shows had a similar attendance, but this increased as the tour progressed. The 20 April show at the Manchester Free Trade Hall was only attended by a few hundred people, but at the end of the show, Bowie was carried out into the audience by fans. At the 17 June show at Oxford Town Hall, Bowie simulated fellatio on Ronson's guitar. The scene was photographed by Mick Rock and was published on the front cover of Melody Maker, greatly raising Bowie's profile in the UK. On the 25 June at the Greyhound, Croydon, Bowie was supported by Roxy Music and Trapeze.

The 15 July show at the Friars Aylesbury included several US music journalists in the audience, including Dave Marsh and Lillian Roxon. Bowie's management spent $25,000 to fly them, along with US representatives of their record label RCA Records, to preview his live work before starting a major US tour that autumn.

After several months on the road, Bowie took a break to revisit and re-rehearse the live show, to include greater theatrics and costume changes. Rehearsals took place at the Stratford Royal Theatre. The first concert after this was at the Rainbow Theatre on 19 August, where Bowie was simply billed as "Ziggy Stardust". A second show was added for the following day after the first one sold out. Pianist Nicky Graham was added to the band line-up for these shows.

The first leg in the US began in September 1972. Bowie travelled there by boat as he did not like flying. Bowie and the Spiders from Mars played their first US show in the Cleveland Music Hall on 22 September.  It was also pianist Mike Garson's debut. Six days later, Bowie played a sold-out show at Carnegie Hall. The concerts drew rave reviews from the press and led to the tour being extended for a further two months. A concert on 20 October at the Santa Monica Civic Auditorium was broadcast on radio, and heavily bootlegged before finally being released in 1994. The press coverage of the tour turned Bowie into a star in the US and he was featured on the front cover of Rolling Stone.

The year ended with a short UK leg, which carried over into the start of 1973. Bowie played two shows at the Rainbow just before Christmas, and asked the audience to bring toys along to the concert that could be redistributed to children. The mid-show acoustic set that had been part of all the gigs until then was discarded, and Bowie with the Spiders played just an electric set.

1973
At the start of 1973, Bowie called his friend Geoffrey MacCormack, saying he wanted to expand the musical line-up on stage, and asked if he would be a backing vocalist and travel with him. Another friend, John Hutchinson was recruited as an additional rhythm guitarist; the pair had previously collaborated on the demo of "Space Oddity".

The second US leg began in early 1973 with a sell-out show at the Radio City Music Hall, New York, on 14 February, which saw fans queuing at 2:30 pm for an evening show. Bowie's costumes were designed by Kansai Yamamoto. During the end of set, he collapsed and had to be assisted. The tour subsequently moved to Japan. Bowie then travelled by ferry across the Sea of Japan to Vladivostok, and travelled on the Trans-Siberian Railway to Moscow in order to get back to Britain. During this time, the Spiders from Mars complained they were still on the same wages as when they had started playing with Bowie despite multiple sold-out shows. They re-negotiated their fees with Bowie's manager Tony Defries, but this caused a rift in the band.

The final leg of the tour covered the UK and began on 12 May 1973 with a concert at Earls Court Exhibition Centre in front of an audience of 18,000. Police forced the show to stop for 15 minutes while they battled with fans trying to storm the stage. Mick and Bianca Jagger attended the show. The concert was fraught with technical difficulties and an inadequate PA system, leading to disgruntled fans.

The last performance was at the Hammersmith Odeon on 3 July and was filmed by D. A. Pennebaker. Woodmansey recalled the show was one of the best the band had played, because it was close to their London base and almost the end of an exhausting tour. Towards the end of the show, Bowie announced "not only is it the last show of the tour, but it's the last show that we'll ever do". Ronson had been told in advance by Bowie that the Spiders from Mars would split, but the announcement took Bolder and Woodmansey by surprise.

Personnel

Musicians
David Bowie (Ziggy Stardust) – vocals, guitar, harmonica

 The Spiders from Mars
Mick Ronson – guitar, vocals
Trevor Bolder – bass
Mick "Woody" Woodmansey – drums

 Other musicians
Robin Lumley – piano (June – July 1972)
Nicky Graham – piano (August – September 1972)
Mike Garson – piano, keyboards (September 1972 – end of tour)

 Other musicians on the 1973 legs
John Hutchinson – rhythm guitar, 12-string acoustic guitar
Warren Peace – backing vocals, percussion
Ken Fordham – saxophone
Brian Wilshaw – saxophone, flute

Timeline

Tour dates

 See Aladdin Sane 30th Anniversary 2CD Edition
 See Aladdin Sane 30th Anniversary 2CD Edition and Live Santa Monica '72
 See Aladdin Sane 30th Anniversary 2CD Edition)
 See Ziggy Stardust and the Spiders from Mars: The Motion Picture and Ziggy Stardust and the Spiders from Mars: The Motion Picture – 30th Anniversary 2CD Special Edition)

1972 tour dates Source: BowieWonderWorld.com
1973 tour dates Source: BowieWonderWorld.com

Songs
Bowie varied his setlist throughout the tour. A setlist from the tour would include any of the following songs:

From David Bowie
 "Space Oddity"
 "Wild Eyed Boy from Freecloud"
 "Memory of a Free Festival"
From The Man Who Sold the World
 "The Width of a Circle"
 "The Supermen"
From Hunky Dory
 "Changes"
 "Oh! You Pretty Things"
 "Life on Mars?"
 "Quicksand"
 "Andy Warhol"
 "Song for Bob Dylan"
 "Queen Bitch"
From The Rise and Fall of Ziggy Stardust and the Spiders from Mars
 "Five Years"
 "Soul Love"
 "Moonage Daydream"
 "Starman"
 "Lady Stardust" (on rare occasions in 1972)
 "Hang On to Yourself"
 "Ziggy Stardust"
 "Suffragette City"
 "Rock 'n' Roll Suicide"

From Aladdin Sane
 "Watch That Man"
 "Aladdin Sane (1913-1938-197?)"
 "Drive-In Saturday"
 "Panic in Detroit"
 "Cracked Actor"
 "Time"
 "The Prettiest Star"
 "Let's Spend the Night Together"
 "The Jean Genie"
Other
 "I Feel Free" (from Fresh Cream (1966) by Cream; written by Pete Brown & Jack Bruce)
 "Ode to Joy" (from Symphony No. 9 (1824) by Ludwig van Beethoven; as the pre-show music)
 "All the Young Dudes" (from All the Young Dudes (1972) by Mott the Hoople; written by Bowie)
 "Amsterdam" (the B-side of the "Sorrow" single (1973); originally from Enregistrement Public à l'Olympia 1964 (1967) by Jacques Brel, written by Brel & Mort Shuman)
 "John, I'm Only Dancing" (non-album single released in 1972; the sax version was released the following year; written by Bowie)
 "Love Me Do" (included as a part of "The Jean Genie") (from Please Please Me (1963) by The Beatles; written by John Lennon & Paul McCartney)
 "My Death" (from La Valse à Mille Temps (1959) by Jacques Brel, written by Brel & Shuman)
 "Around and Around" (B-side of "Johnny B. Goode single (1958) by Chuck Berry)
 "I'm Waiting for the Man" (from The Velvet Underground & Nico (1967) by The Velvet Underground and Nico, written by Lou Reed)
 "White Light/White Heat" (from White Light/White Heat (1968) by The Velvet Underground, written by Lou Reed)

References
Citations

Sources

External links
 Interview with Robin Mayhew on the Ziggy Stardust Tour's PA and sound system

David Bowie concert tours
1972 concert tours
1973 concert tours